Ognev's long-eared bat (Plecotus ognevi) is a species of bat found in Asia. By 2006, it was recognized as a separate species from the P. auritus species complex.

Range and habitat

Ognev's long-eared bat was recorded in the following countries : China, Kazakhstan, South-Korea, North Korea, Mongolia and Russia. It was recorded in habitats such as the taiga and Southern Siberian mountain forests as well as temperate mixed and temperate deciduous forests.

References

Plecotus
Mammals described in 1927
Bats of Asia
Taxa named by Kyukichi Kishida